John Cecil Stephenson (18 September 1889, in Bishop Auckland, County Durham – 1965, in London) was a British abstract artist and pioneer of Modernism.

Biography
Stephenson was educated at Leeds School of Art from 1909–14, the last two years as a pupil-teacher. In 1914 he won a scholarship to the Royal College of Art and moved to London, at 6, the Mall Studios, near Hampstead, where he remained for the rest of his life. The studio had previously belonged to Walter Sickert.

In 1922, Stephenson was appointed Director of Art at the Northern Polytechnic in London, a post he retained until 1940 when he was made redundant.

In 1928, Barbara Hepworth became his next door neighbor when she moved into 7, the Mall Studios with her first husband John Skeaping. His other friends and neighbours over the years included Piet Mondrian, Henry Moore, Herbert Read, Walter Gropius, Alexander Calder and Ben Nicholson.

In 1933, along with Ben Nicholson, Stephenson exhibited for the first time with the Seven and Five Society, and in 1935 he took part in the Seven and Five's first exhibition of entirely abstract art.

In 1937, Stephenson contributed a page to Ben Nicholson, Leslie Martin and Naum Gabo's influential Circle: an international survey of Constructivist art. During the Second World War, Stephenson acted as a fire warden in London and sketched war damage in the city. His own studio was damaged during the Blitz. In 1942, Stephenson married the artist Kathleen Guthrie.

In 1961, Stephenson was elected a Fellow of Free Painters and Sculptors.

Collections
Stephenson's 1937 work Painting is in the Tate collection, two works are in the Imperial War Museum collection, and his Painting II (1937) was acquired by the Scottish National Gallery of Modern Art in 2008.  His works can also be found in the collections of the Arts Council of Great Britain, Staatsgalerie Stuttgart, the National Museum, Warsaw, the British Museum, the V&A, the National Museum Wales and the Government Art Collection.

Exhibitions
Stephenson exhibited widely throughout his life and posthumously, and was included in the following significant exhibitions:

 1933: Seven & Five Society
 1935: Seven & Five Abstract Group
 1939: Abstract Work, Artists International Association, Whitechapel Art Gallery
 1951: Luminescent Ceiling Decoration in the Pavilion of Power and Production at the Festival of Britain, 10 × 30 feet, executed in fluorescent colours and illuminated by ultra-violet mercury lamps.
 1953: exhibited for the first time with the London Group
 1961: Divergencies, Qantas Gallery, Piccadilly, an exhibition by the Fellows of Free Painters and Sculptors which included Stephenson, Frank Avray Wilson, Cliff Holden, E. L. T. Mesens, Denis Bowen, Roy Turner Durrant and others. 
 1965: Historically Important 20th Century Masters, Drian Gallery
 1967: British Painting, Tate Gallery
 1975: Retrospective exhibition, Camden Arts Centre and Laing Art Gallery
 2007: British Art, 1900–2007, Tate Britain
 2008: In Memoriam Halina Nałęcz exhibition at the National Museum, Warsaw
 2011: John Cecil Stephenson: Pioneer of Modernism, Durham Art Gallery

References

External links
 Artist's website
 
 Simon Guthrie's biography of Stephenson on Google Books
 Stephenson exhibition catalogue at Liss Fine Art
 Stephenson biography at the Paisnel Gallery
 Stephenson page at britishabstractart.com

1889 births
1965 deaths
20th-century English male artists
20th-century English painters
Abstract painters
Alumni of Leeds Arts University
Alumni of the Royal College of Art
English male painters
People from Bishop Auckland
World War II artists